Loudetia simplex is a grass species found in tropical and Southern Africa and Madagascar. It was originally described as a Tristachya species by Christian Gottfried Daniel Nees von Esenbeck in 1841 and was transferred to Loudetia by Charles Edward Hubbard in 1934.

The lemma carries a 25–50 mm long awn.

Like all Loudetia species, L. simplex uses C4 photosynthesis and occurs in open habitats, often on poor shallow soils. It is a significant weed species.

Two subspecies have been described:
Loudetia simplex subsp. simplex	 	 
Loudetia simplex subsp. stipoides

In Madagascar, it is one of the dominant grassland species in the central high plateaus, where it occurs on leached, poorly drained soils and is quite fire-resistant. In Malagasy, it is known locally as horona, horo, berambo, kilailay, kirodrotra, or felika. It has only medium value as pasture grass.

References

Panicoideae
Flora of Africa
Flora of Madagascar
Flora of the Madagascar subhumid forests